Anthony Joseph  Alcantar (born in 1959 or 1960) is an American actor. He has done improv work with the Windy City Women Improv Troupe, acted in TV shows and films, provided voice acting for TV animation and video games, and worked as a dialect coach.

Career
Alcantar was born and raised in Chicago. He earned a Bachelor of Arts degree in theater and MFA in acting from the Theatre Conservatory at Roosevelt University.

Career 
Alcantar toured and performed with The Second City in both Toronto and London, Ontario. From 1989 to 1998, Alcantar taught at the Players Workshop of the Second City, directing 16 shows there.

After relocating to Vancouver, British Columbia, in 1999, Alcantar landed guest star or recurring roles on numerous shows, including Stargate SG-1, Dead Like Me, Da Vinci's Inquest, The Dead Zone, The Collector, Andromeda, Dark Angel, Millennium, Strange World, Honey I Shrunk the Kids, Just Deal, Cold Squad, Los Luchadores, The Outer Limits, and Breaking News. He had a recurring role on NBC's series American Dreams.

Alcantar performed in the mockumentary Best in Show, the all-improvised film directed by Christopher Guest. He also appeared in MVPII, The Rhino Brothers, Ballistic: Ecks vs. Sever, The Charlie's Angels Story, Chestnut: Hero of Central Park, Hope Springs, Fantastic Four, His and Her Christmas and In the Land of Women.

Alcantar has had lead and principal roles in the animated shows Slammin' Sammy, Being Ian, Alienators: Evolution Continues, Inspector Gadget and the Gadgetinis, Kong: The Animated Series, Gundam Wing, Journey to the Center of the Earth, and MegaMan NT Warrior. He has provided both voice and body to the upcoming Electronic Arts' video game The Godfather: The Game and did multiple voices for SSX On Tour. Alcantar has also been the dialect coach on the features Slither, Whisper, and The Wicker Man. He has worked as a dialect coach on the TV shows Fargo and Fear the Walking Dead.

In 2017, he played a minor role as the Mayor of Fillydelphia in the My Little Pony: Friendship Is Magic season seven episode "A Royal Problem".

Notable students 
Sean Hayes, Emmy winner, and star of Will & Grace  studied under Tony at the Players Workshop of The Second City.
Stephnie Weir, star of MADtv, studied under Tony at the Players Workshop of The Second City in the 1990s.
Grace Park, who plays Boomer in Battlestar Galactica studied with Tony at Improv Chicago in Vancouver.

Filmography

Film

Television

Video games

References

External links 
Windy City Women

Male actors from Chicago
American male comedians
American impressionists (entertainers)
American male television actors
Living people
Roosevelt University alumni
Roosevelt University faculty
Comedians from Illinois
Year of birth missing (living people)